was a town located in the former Shima District, Mie Prefecture, Japan.

As of 2003, the town had an estimated population of 9,172 and a density of 117.29 persons per km². The total area was 78.20 km².

On October 1, 2004, Isobe, along with the towns of Shima (former), Ago, Daiō and Hamajima (all from Shima District), was merged to create the city of Shima and no longer exists as an independent municipality.

Localities/Areas
Isobe Town is sub-divided into 3 localities/areas: Isobe (proper), Matoya and Seiki, which are sub-divided into 10 hamlets.

Isobe Area
(4 hamlets)

Matoya Area
(3 hamlets)

Seiki Area
(3 hamlets)

External links
 Official website of Shima

Dissolved municipalities of Mie Prefecture